Michèle Lurot (née Davaze on 23 April 1940) is a retired French sprinter. She competed in the 200 m and 4 × 100 m relay events at the 1964 Summer Olympics, and finished in eights place in the relay. Her personal bests are 11.9 s in the 100 m (1962) and 24.3 s in the 200 m (1964).

Her husband Maurice also competed in sprint running at the 1964 Games.

References

1943 births
Living people
French female sprinters
Olympic athletes of France
Athletes (track and field) at the 1964 Summer Olympics